Motala AIF is a Swedish football club located in Motala in Östergötland.  Other sports that the club promotes include athletics, orienteering, ice hockey, road cycling, and skiing.

Background
Since their foundation on 29 August 1907 Motala AIF has participated mainly in the upper and middle divisions of the Swedish football league system.  The highlight was in  1957/1958 when the club played one season in the Allsvenskan.  During this season MAIF's attendance record was broken when 13,058 spectators watched the match with Örgryte IS. In more recent years a source of pride was when MAIF played in the second tier Superettan in the 2001 season. However, in total the club has actually played 25 seasons in the Swedish second tier. The club currently plays in Division 1 Södra which is the third tier of Swedish football. They play their home matches at the Idrottsparken Motala.

Motala AIF are affiliated to the Östergötlands Fotbollförbund.

Season to season

 League restructuring in 2006 resulted in a new division being created at Tier 3 and subsequent divisions dropping a level.

Current squad

Attendances

In recent seasons Motala AIF have had the following average attendances:

Footnotes

External links
 Motala AIF – Official club website
 Football Club Website

 
Sport in Motala
Football clubs in Östergötland County
Association football clubs established in 1907
1907 establishments in Sweden
Athletics clubs in Sweden